The French submarine Argonaute was an experimental attack submarine built for the French Navy between 1903 and 1911. Initially named Omega, Argonaute was laid down in January 1903, launched in November 1905 and commissioned in 1911. She was essentially an experimental submarine, and although in service during World War I, saw no action. Argonaute was decommissioned in 1919.

Design
Omega was designed by Émile Berti and Emmanuel Petithomme. Initially, Omega was to be equipped with a special diesel engine to power the submarine both on the surface and submerged, but the failure of the concept on the French submarine Z forced the constructors to install a steam engine and an electric motor instead.

Her complement was 22 men.

The submarine's armament comprised two  bow torpedo tubes, two  Drzewiecki drop collar torpedo launchers and two torpedoes in external cradles.

Construction and career
Omega was built in the Arsenal de Toulon. She was laid down in January 1903 and was launched on 28 November 1905. On 27 September 1910, the ship was renamed "Argonaute", and was commissioned in January 1911.

Argonaute served in the Mediterranean Sea until 20 May 1919, when it was struck from the Navy list.

See also 

List of submarines of France

Notes

References

Citations

Cited sources 

 

World War I submarines of France
1905 ships